Par railway station serves the villages of Par, Tywardreath and St Blazey, Cornwall, England.

The station is managed by Great Western Railway, which operates the train services along with CrossCountry.

History

The station opened with the Cornwall Railway on 4 May 1859. The West Briton and Cornwall Advertiser reported at the time that it is situated on the western side of Par bay, about a mile from the pier head, close to the road to Fowey and Tywardreath, the traffic of which places as well as St Blazey and the neighbourhoods intended to receive here. The departure and arrival stations are spacious edifices, both having verandahs projecting over the platforms, with convenient waiting rooms, ticket office, porter and lamp rooms, and other necessary conveniences. A goods station has not yet been erected, but considering the amount of business likely to be transacted here it is more than probable that a goods shed will be required before long.

The goods shed was approved by the directors on 10 February 1860 and was built of stone.

The station was too small to warrant a station master, but the "booking constable" was paid an additional 22 pounds each year by the Post Office to also act as a post master. Two cottages were built just outside the station to house railway staff.

In October 1877 during a storm, the roofs of the passenger buildings and goods sheds were torn off.

A connection from Par to the Cornwall Minerals Railway line to Newquay was opened on 1 January 1879. This was standard gauge and so traffic between this and the broad gauge Cornwall Railway had to be transferred between trains at Par until the broad gauge was converted over the weekend of 21 May 1892. New station buildings were erected in 1884.

The Cornwall Railway was amalgamated into the Great Western Railway on 1 July 1889. The Great Western Railway was nationalised into British Railways from 1 January 1948. This in turn was privatised in the 1990s.

On 19 May 1968 an experimental Freightliner terminal was opened on the site of the now demolished goods shed. Containers were switched between rail and road vehicles; mainly china clay traffic was handled but this did not preclude other goods. It only lasted for a couple of years.

Location

The line approaching Par from London and Plymouth descends an incline from Treverrin Tunnel, before passing under a road overbridge adjacent to the Royal Inn, which at one time was the Station Hotel. Between the bridge and the station approach are two cottages that were originally built as accommodation for railway workers.

The main line climbs up as it leaves the station towards St Austell, passing over Par Viaduct and Par Harbour. Trains on the Newquay branch traverse a sharp curve of almost 180 degrees where the line then passes St Blazey Freight Yard and the old platforms of St Blazey railway station, which also has a signal box which is still open. The line then joins the route of the former Cornwall Minerals Railway north to their destination. A freight spur follows the line of the old minerals railway south into Par Harbour, passing under Par Viaduct and the main line as it does so.

Platform layout and facilities 
 Platform 1 is directly accessed from the station entrance and car park, and the main station buildings (including staff accommodation and a part-day-staffed ticket office) dating from 1879 are on this platform, as is a passenger-operated self-service ticket machine. Trains arrive here from London Paddington, Exeter and Plymouth before continuing to St Austell, Truro and Penzance.
 Platform 2 is located across the main line tracks from platform 1, and is accessed via a footbridge from that platform. Trains arrive here from Penzance, Truro and St Austell before continuing to Plymouth, Exeter and London Paddington.
 Platform 3 forms the other side of an island platform with platform 2, and is accessed by the same footbridge. Trains arrive and depart here to and from Newquay.

Passenger volume
Par station has one of the fastest growth in passenger numbers in Cornwall.  Despite a slight decrease in 2007–08, comparing the year from April 2006 to that which started in April 2002, passenger numbers increased by 42%.

The statistics cover twelve month periods that start in April.

Services

Some trains run through to or from London Paddington station, including the Night Riviera overnight sleeping car service. Typical journey times by a through daytime train are around 50 minutes to Plymouth, 70 minutes to Penzance, and about 4 hours to Paddington.

There are a limited number of CrossCountry trains providing a service to and from Bristol, Birmingham and stations in the north such as Manchester,  and Edinburgh.

The branch line to Newquay sees a mixture of self-contained services and ones that run through to Plymouth.  On summer weekends most of the usual local services are withdrawn and replaced by a mixture of Great Western Railway trains from London Paddington, and CrossCountry trains from the North of England, all of which run non-stop from Par to the terminus.

Signal box

The signal box is located at the southern end of Platform 2 and opened in 1879. When it was first built it was less than half its current length. The original box only contained 26 levers, but the frame was replaced in 1913 when 57 more levers were added.

Signals controlled from Par carry the identification code 'PR'.

Community rail
The trains between Par and Newquay are designated as a community rail service and is supported by marketing provided by the Devon and Cornwall Rail Partnership.  The line is promoted under the Atlantic Coast Line name.

Six pubs near Par station take part in the Atlantic Coast Line rail ale trail, including some in neighbouring Tywardreath and St Blazey.

References

External links

Railway stations in Cornwall
Railway stations in Great Britain opened in 1859
Former Great Western Railway stations
Railway stations served by Great Western Railway
Railway stations served by CrossCountry
St Blazey
DfT Category E stations